Gerardo Josimar Heredia Ávila (born 26 November 1993) is a Mexican footballer who plays as a centre back for Liga Premier de México club La Piedad.

Club career

Early career 
Heredia played for Deportivo Toluca in the u-17 and u-20 categories from 2010 to 2014. He was then registered with the first team and then loaned to Tlaxcala FC.

Deportivo Toluca 
On 13 April 2014, Heredia made his officially debut in the top division, coming as substitute at minute 87' for Jorge Sartiaguin against Club León, the Red Devils won 2–1.

External links
 
 

1993 births
Living people
Mexican footballers
Association football defenders
Deportivo Toluca F.C. players
Tlaxcala F.C. players
La Piedad footballers
Liga MX players
Liga Premier de México players
Footballers from Guadalajara, Jalisco